The Charles C. Glover Memorial Bridge or Massachusetts Avenue Bridge in Northwest Washington, D.C. conveys Massachusetts Avenue over Rock Creek and Rock Creek Park.

History and name

A much smaller iron truss bridge was built at the bottom of the valley in 1888, following the decision to extend Massachusetts Avenue beyond Florida Avenue. In 1901, this bridge was replaced with a land fill, with Rock Creek channeled through a large culvert.

This in turn became inconvenient when Rock Creek Parkway was built in the 1930s. The construction of the bridge also allowed the level of Massachusetts Avenue to be raised significantly compared with the earlier bridge and land fill.

The bridge was named after Charles Carroll Glover, who had played a decisive role in shaping this area of Northwest Washington and who died in 1936.

On November 20, 1946, Stephen Norman, grandson of Theodor Herzl, jumped off the bridge to his death three weeks after learning that his whole family had been murdered in the Holocaust.

See also
List of bridges documented by the Historic American Engineering Record in Washington, D.C.

References

External links

Bridges completed in 1939
Bridges over Rock Creek (Potomac River tributary)
Historic American Engineering Record in Washington, D.C.
Road bridges in Washington, D.C.
1939 establishments in Washington, D.C.
Concrete bridges in the United States
Arch bridges in the United States
Embassy Row